Epacris breviflora, commonly known as drumstick heath, is a plant of the heath family, Ericaceae and is endemic to the south-east of the Australian continent. It is an erect shrub with egg-shaped leaves with a sharp-pointed tip and with clusters of white flowers arranged near the end of the branches. It grows in Victoria, New South Wales and the far south-east of Queensland.

Description
The leaves have a rounded base and a sharply pointed tip. The flowers are clustered in the axils of the upper leaves. The five stamens and the single style are mostly enclosed in the petal tube. Flowering is mainly in summer but flowers are usually present throughout the year.

Taxonomy and naming
Epacris breviflora was first formally described in 1910 by Otto Stapf and the description was published in Bulletin of Miscellaneous Information. The specific epithet (breviflora) means "short-flowered".

Distribution and habitat
Drumstick heath mainly occurs along the Great Dividing Range from far south-eastern Queensland to eastern Victoria, sometimes at lower altitudes subject to cooler temperatures. It grows in swamps and other damp places.

References 

breviflora
Ericales of Australia
Flora of New South Wales
Flora of Queensland
Flora of Victoria (Australia)
Plants described in 1910
Taxa named by Otto Stapf